Raghunath Bhattacharyya (died 18 June 2013) was an Indian judge. He was a member of the Kolkata High Court from 2010 to his death.

Death
Bhattacharyya died of COPD on 18 June 2013 at the age of 61.

References

Judges of the Calcutta High Court
Year of birth missing
2013 deaths
20th-century Indian judges
21st-century Indian judges